The Auton trilogy is a series of direct-to-video spin-off productions based on the long running BBC science fiction series Doctor Who. The three films in the series are Auton (1997), Auton 2: Sentinel (1998; working title, Auton 2: The Rapture) and Auton 3 (1999; working title, Auton 3: Awakening). They were produced by the independent BBV company and are sequels to the Third Doctor stories Spearhead from Space and Terror of the Autons. All three films have been reissued on DVD.

All story elements relating to Doctor Who were licensed from their respective authors.

Synopses
When a Nestene energy unit and several Autons are reactivated at a UNIT facility, a plot for world domination that predates mankind is set in motion.

Plot

Auton

At a top secret UNIT facility known only as "the Warehouse", Dr Sally Arnold has been studying a Nestene energy unit with no results. As a last resort, she subjects the artifact to cosmic signals from UNIT's most powerful deep space scanning satellite. This causes a violent energy release that kills her assistant, Janice. The energy unit has disappeared.

A containment team, led by a psychic UNIT operative named Lockwood, has been dispatched. Among Lockwood's abilities is the ability to access all information from any computer mainframe in the world with his mind.

They soon learn that the Nestene energy unity has taken on a mobile form, and that there is an Auton copy of senior archivist Graham Winslet. The real Winslet is still alive, his mind being used by the Autons as a resource of information. The energy unit then merges with the Auton Winslet.

Several dormant Autons in the Warehouse come back to life and the building becomes a battlefield. They are eventually defeated with the weapon created by the Doctor and Liz Shaw in Spearhead from Space. The Auton Winslet then liquefies and escapes through a ventilation shaft.

Reception
Karen Davies wrote in the fanzine Celestial Toyroom that the story was "an enjoyable, but undemanding 57 minutes". In particular, Karen felt that the direction paused too often and the dialogue was not realistic enough.  In Doctor Who Magazine, Dave Owen would heavily praise Michael Wade's performance, stating that he was "so superciliously smug and patronizing that he demands your attention".

Modern criticism has remained mostly positive. In the book Downtime - The Lost Years of Doctor Who, Dylan Rees stated that the film was "the most Doctor Who like of all BBV films. It is also the most B-movie in its direction." He would go on to praise the story and performances, but criticized the direction.

Novelisation
A novelisation of this drama written by David Black was published in early 2022.

Auton 2: Sentinel

Two years after the Warehouse incident, a lorry transporting Autons from the Warehouse to another UNIT facility is hijacked by its own cargo. Meanwhile, Lockwood is troubled by extremely active dreams. UNIT learns that the transfer of the Autons was authorized by Lockwood. When he later remembers signing the transportation docket, it becomes evident that the Nestene Consciousness is using Lockwood's psychic abilities to their own ends.

UNIT's Internal Security Division launches an investigation on Lockwood, pairing him with another psychic operative named Natasha Alexander. While Lockwood's abilities are owed to an alien implant, Natasha claims to have been psychic since birth.

The escaped Autons are traced to Sentinel Island. There the Auton Winslet has installed himself as the local vicar. He has brainwashed most of the island's inhabitants and the Autons have killed those who resisted. They are using the combined mental energy of the church's congregation to awaken a Nestene creature buried beneath.

There are dormant Nestenes lying underground around the world. They were put in place before the development of the human race. Their locations have become known to humanity as holy sites and are connected by ley lines.

When Lockwood and Natasha arrive at the church, they succeed in reviving the Nestene. The Nestene attempts to awaken the others. Lockwood tries to defeat it, but instead absorbs the creature into his own mind.

Reception
Dylan Rees gave a positive review of the film in Downtime - The Lost Years of Doctor Who, calling it a "drama that perfectly straddles the divide between its Doctor Who origins and contemporary science fiction".

Dave Owen also praised the story, as well as the CGI and music.

Auton 3

Lockwood and Natasha have returned from Sentinel Island, coming on shore in the town of Millhampton. Computers around the world are failing. They are being invaded by the Nestene Consciousness through Lockwood's implant.

Meanwhile, the entire population of Millhampton has disappeared. They have been absorbed into the mind of another revived Nestene below the city. The only survivor is the real Winslet, who is still being used by the Nestenes at the local psychiatric hospital.

Lockwood and Natasha are both being used by another psychic UNIT operative named Palmer to lead them to the heart of the Nestene activity. Palmer monitors their movements through a constant link with Natasha's mind.

Meanwhile, Natasha is used by the Nestenes to lure Lockwood to the hospital, which the Autons are using as the centre of their operation. There the Auton Winslet is trying to free the Nestene energy from Lockwood's mind so it can infect every computer in the world and revive all the dormant Nestene creatures. Lockwood resists by convincing himself that everything he sees is a dream.

When Dr. Arnold arrives, his resolve is broken. He is then forced to sacrifice his own life to destroy the Nestene plan.

Reception
Unlike the previous two films, Auton 3 received much more negative reviews from critics. Doctor Who Magazine heavily criticized the production, focusing on the writing and stated that it "shamelessly cribbed from The X-Files". Modern criticism has also continued the negative trend, with Dylan Rees stating in the book Downtime - The Lost Years of Doctor Who that the film was "a mess from start to finish" and that the direction was stilted and poor.

However, Dreamwatch would give the film a positive review, with Richard McGinlay stating that it was "powerfully realized and performed".

Trivia and continuity
 Auton was originally intended to include Brigadier Alistair Lethbridge-Stewart, but actor Nicholas Courtney had to decline due to the fact he was ill during production. The character of the Brigadier was replaced by Lockwood, who would also appear in the next two films.
 In Auton 2: Sentinel, it is revealed that Lockwood is actually the codename of the otherwise unnamed UNIT Operative 8954B.
 The call sign Greyhound Leader, used in Doctor Who successively by Brigadier Lethbridge-Stewart, Brigadier Bambera, and Kate Stewart, is used by three different characters in the trilogy: Lockwood (Auton), Colonel Wilson (Auton 2: Sentinel) and Ross Palmer (Auton 3: Awakening).
A spoof of these dramas, titled "The Auton Diaries", is included on the VHS and DVD releases of Auton 3: Awakening. The plot involves an out of work Auton finding new employment at BBV.
 BBV's Do You Have a Licence to Save this Planet includes an Auton 3-style Auton.
 Nicholas Briggs, who directed the first two films and wrote all three, would go on to play the voices of the Daleks and Cybermen in the 2005 revival, as well as original Dalek voice actor, Peter Hawkins, in An Adventure in Space and Time and government official, Rick Yates, in Torchwood: Children of Earth.
 In a chase scene about 13 minutes into Auton 3: Awakening, the Autons have shadows longer than their own bodies, the sun being low in the sky. However, 10 seconds later they are seen with much shorter shadows, revealing that different parts of the chase were filmed at significantly different times of day, in the BBC car park in Southampton.
 US retailer Who North America (http://www.whona.com) contributed US$10,000 to the Auton 3 project.
 When admiring the warehoused Auton-killing device near the end of the first film, Lockwood compliments its absent designer: "Not a bad bit of workmanship, Doctor John Smith." The Third Doctor built the device in his première serial, Spearhead from Space, at the end of which he asked his new employer, Brigadier Lethbridge-Stewart, to use the name John Smith on his UNIT credentials.

Sources
 The Auton Trilogy video set

References

External links
 
 
 

Film series introduced in 1997
1990s science fiction films
1990s thriller films
Alien invasions in films
British film series
British science fiction films
Direct-to-video film series
Film spin-offs
UNIT stories
F Auton trilogy
Bill & Ben Video
Films with screenplays by Nicholas Briggs
Trilogies
1990s English-language films
1990s British films